Fonfon Glacier is the 4 km long and 2.3 km wide glacier on the east side of the main crest of north-central Sentinel Range in Ellsworth Mountains, Antarctica.  It is situated north of Gerila Glacier and south of the head of Embree Glacier.  The glacier drains the northeast slopes of the northern summit of Long Gables Peak and the southeast slopes of Mount Anderson, flows northeastwards and joins upper Ellen Glacier southeast of Eyer Peak.

The glacier is named after the Fonfon locality on Vitosha Mountain, Bulgaria.

Location
US mapping in 1961 and 1988.

See also
 List of glaciers in the Antarctic
 Glaciology

Maps
 Vinson Massif.  Scale 1:250 000 topographic map.  Reston, Virginia: US Geological Survey, 1988.
 Antarctic Digital Database (ADD). Scale 1:250000 topographic map of Antarctica. Scientific Committee on Antarctic Research (SCAR). Since 1993, regularly updated.

References
 Fonfon Glacier SCAR Composite Gazetteer of Antarctica
 Bulgarian Antarctic Gazetteer. Antarctic Place-names Commission. (details in Bulgarian, basic data in English)

External links
 Fonfon Glacier. Copernix satellite image

Glaciers of Ellsworth Land
Bulgaria and the Antarctic